Pseudalcis is a genus of moths in the family Geometridae described by Warren in 1897.

Species
Pseudalcis albata Warren Java, Sumatra
Pseudalcis renaria Guenée northern India, Myanmar, Thailand
Pseudalcis catoriata Warren, 1897 Borneo
Pseudalcis cinerascens Warren, 1897 Borneo
Pseudalcis trispinaria (Walker, 1860) Thailand

References

Boarmiini